Amir Khodamoradi (born September 21, 1982)  is an Iranian football player, who currently plays for  Shahrdari Bandar Abbas of the Azadegan League

Club career
Khodamoradi joined Foolad in 2009 after spending the previous season at Malavan F.C.

Club career statistics

 Assist Goals

References

1982 births
Iranian footballers
Malavan players
Foolad FC players
Living people
Shahrdari Bandar Abbas players
Place of birth missing (living people)
Association football midfielders
People from Sanandaj